Eternamente amándonos is a Mexican telenovela that premiered on Las Estrellas on 27 February 2023. The series is produced by Silvia Cano. It is an adaptation of the Turkish series İstanbullu Gelin. It stars Diana Bracho, Marcus Ornellas and Alejandra Robles Gil.

Plot 
Paula Bernal (Alejandra Robles Gil) and Rogelio Iturbide (Marcus Ornellas), two people with very different lives, instantly fall in love upon meeting and marry without letting Rogelio's family know, especially the matriarch of the family, Martina Rangel (Diana Bracho). When Paula arrives from Mexico City to the Iturbide's home, her lifestyle ideas clash with those of Martina, a manipulative woman accustomed to controlling her surroundings. Martina has sacrificed her happiness to follow the customs of Morelia society and, feeling threatened, declares a war on Paula.

Cast 
 Diana Bracho as Martina Rangel
 Eva Daniela as young Martina
 Marcus Ornellas as Rogelio Iturbide
 Alejandra Robles Gil as Paula Bernal
 Ana Bertha Espín as Irma Ruvalcaba
 Juan Martín Jáuregui as Ignacio Cordero
 Francisco Pizaña as Fernando Iturbide
 Alfredo Gatica as Fidel Fuentes
 Gema Garoa as Imelda Campos
 Arantza Ruiz as Cecilia Escutia
 David Caro Levy as Marco Iturbide
 Valentina Buzzuro as Blanca Ortiz
 Patricio José Campos as Luis Iturbide
 Dalilah Polanco as Eva Gómez
 Rossana Nájera as Érika Maldonado
 Elizabeth Guindi as Beatriz
 Claudia Rios as Micaela Cornejo
 Fermín Martínez as Honorio González
 Alejandra Ley as Felipa Contreras
 Santiago Zenteno as Melitón Pacheco
 Kaled Acab as Lucas Brown Maldonado
 Otto Sirgo as Gabriel Garibay
 Julia Urbini as Andrea
 Daniel Gama as Ulises

Recurring and guest stars 
 Omar Fierro as Paco Medina
 Pablo Valentín as Óscar
 Pía Sanz as Patricia
 Erik Díaz as Ricardo
 Natalia Madera as Alejandra
 Arena Ibarra as Jimena
 Paco Luna
 Clarissa González
 Lesslie Apodaca
 Hans Gaitán
 Germán Gutiérrez
 Daniel Vidal
 Juan Sahagún

Production 
On 24 November 2022, Marcus Ornellas and Alejandra Robles Gil were announced in the lead roles. Filming began on 8 December 2022.

Ratings

Episodes

Notes

References

External links 
 

2023 telenovelas
2023 Mexican television series debuts
2020s Mexican television series
Televisa telenovelas
Mexican telenovelas
Spanish-language telenovelas
Mexican television series based on Turkish television series